In 2017 the department was merged with the Department of Geology and Mineral Resources Engineering, forming the new 
Department of Geoscience and Petroleum.

The Norwegian University of Science and Technology (NTNU) is the key university of science and technology in Norway. The Department of Petroleum Engineering and Applied Geophysics (IPT) was established in 1973, shortly after the start of production (Ekofisk field) from the Norwegian continental shelf. The department came to include Petroleum Engineering as well as Geophysics, which is seen as a major strength of the petroleum education at NTNU. The department has elected chairman and vice chairman, and 4 informal groups of professors; geophysics, drilling, production and reservoir engineering. The stated primary purpose of maintaining the informal groups is to take care of the teaching in their respective disciplines. Each group is responsible for offering a sufficient number of courses, semester projects and thesis projects at M.Sc. and Ph.D. levels in their discipline, and to make annual revisions of these in accordance with the needs of society and industry. The total number of  professors, associate professors, assistant professors and adjunct professors is 32. The administrative staff is led by a department administrator, and consists of a total of 6 secretaries. The technical support staff reports to the department head, and consists of 8 engineers and technicians. Until 2000, the department was part of the Applied Earth Sciences faculty, together with the Geology-department. After that, the department is part of the Faculty of Engineering Science and Technology (one of a total of 10 departments).

Brief historical statistics of the department:
 Established in 1973
 More than 2000 graduated M.Sc.´s
 More than 150 graduated Ph.D.´s
 Around 120 M.Sc.´s graduate every year
 Around 10 Ph.D.´s graduate every year
 Currently around 120 full-time teachers, researchers and staff
 Around 450 students enrolled at B.Sc. and M.Sc. levels
 Around 65 PhD students enrolled

Research 
The department focus research within the following 5 areas: Petroleum geophysics, Reservoir engineering, Production engineering, Subsea engineering, Drilling engineering and Integrated operations.

Petroleum Geophysics:
 Marine seismic sources
 Seismic tomography and imaging
 Inversion for elastic parameters (AVA) and reservoir parameters
 Reservoir seismic and rock physics
 Analysis of repeated seismic data (four-dimensional)
 Processing of marine controlled source electromagnetic data
 Modelling and characterization of anisotropic layered media (seismic and EM)

Reservoir Engineering:
 Experimental studies on novel methods for improved oil recovery, like chemical flooding, non-hydrocarbon gas flooding and microbial flooding
 Development of improved methods for numerical simulation of enhanced oil recovery processes in conventional, fractured and heterogeneous reservoirs
 Development of improved techniques for interpretation of well tests, specially related to compressible reservoirs
 Development of phase-behaviour software for non-hydrocarbon injection gases for enhanced oil recovery

Production Engineering
 Multiphase flow in wells and pipelines
 Pumping and artificial lift
 Flow assurance and condition monitoring
 Hydrate for transport of natural gas
 Processing of oil and gas
 Field development

Subsea Engineering:
 All-electric subsea control systems including electrical connectors and valve actuators
 Experimental and numerical studies of near well bore formation damage related to balanced drilling

Drilling engineering:
 Horizontal drilling
 Electric pulse drilling
 Improved drilling fluid properties
 Managed pressure drilling

Integrated operations: The department hosts the Center for Integrated Operations in the Petroleum Industry. Key research areas are drilling, reservoir management, production optimization, operation and maintenance.

International 
The department states that it intends to be strongly focused on the international profile with a friendly multi-cultural atmosphere. From the very beginning the international atmosphere existed at IPT in the form of teachers, researchers and students from various countries. IPT has been actively cooperating with countries like Angola, Aserbadjan, Australia, Austria, Bangladesh, Brazil, Canada, France, Germany, Italy, Iran, Mozambique, Netherlands, Russia, Spain, USA, Venezuela; altogether more than 50 countries. There are two 2-years international programs leading to Master's degrees, one in Petroleum Engineering and one in Petroleum Geoscience. Exchange students may take shorter term education within this program. In addition Ph.D-positions are open to qualified international candidates. These positions also constitute the basis for international research cooperation. Professors have individual scientific cooperation with various foreign institutions. The funding comes from Norwegian agencies SIU (NORAD, QUOTA), EnPe (NORAD, QUOTA), The Research Council of Norway, oil companies Statoil, Total, BP, and NTNU Scholarships; also from European Programs (Erasmus, Marie Curie, TIME, Socrates) and others. IPT cultivates personal international contacts as originators of new collaboration. Graduated Ph.D.s represent a particular bridging potential for new joint research.

Innovation 
New companies, on average one new company each year, are founded by professors and/or students, including: Agir Boosting Technology,  Geoprobing Technology, DeepSeaAnchors, Markland Technology, Natural Gas Hydrate, PERA, Petrostreamz, Petreco, ResLab, Corrocean, Sensorlink, Seres, Technoguide, Verande, Voxelvision, Waptheweb.

References 

Norwegian University of Science and Technology
Norwegian University of Science and Technology, Petroleum
Geophysics organizations
Petroleum engineering schools
Petroleum in Norway
Educational institutions established in 1973
1973 establishments in Norway
1973 in the environment